A term of endearment is a word or phrase used to address and/or describe a person or animal for which the speaker feels love or affection.

Terms of Endearment may also refer to:

 Terms of Endearment (1975), a novel by Larry McMurtry
Terms of Endearment (1983), a romantic comedy-drama film based on McMurtry's novel 
 "Terms of Endearment" (The X-Files), a 1999 episode of The X-Files
 "Terms of Endearment" (Drawn Together episode), 2005

See also
 "Partial Terms of Endearment" (2010), an episode of Family Guy